Boophis vittatus is a species of frogs in the family Mantellidae.

It is endemic to Madagascar.
Its natural habitats are subtropical or tropical moist lowland forests, subtropical or tropical moist montane forests, and rivers.
It is threatened by habitat loss.

References

vittatus
Endemic frogs of Madagascar
Amphibians described in 2001
Taxonomy articles created by Polbot